The globe of the eye, or bulbus oculi, is the eyeball apart from its appendages. A hollow structure, the bulbus oculi is composed of a wall enclosing a cavity filled with fluid with three coats: the sclera, choroid, and the retina. Normally, the bulbus oculi is bulb-like structure. However, the bulbus oculi is not completely spherical. Its anterior surface, transparent and more curved, is known as the cornea of the bulbus oculi.

See also
 Sclera
 Choroid
 Retina

References

Human eye anatomy